Nevasa is a city in Nevasa tehsil of Ahmednagar district in the Indian state of Maharashtra. Old name of this place are Nidhinivas, Nivas and Mahalaya Also town of lord Kuber.
Sant Dnyaneshwar Temple is main temple.
This place is near of Pravara river this river also called Amritvahini.

Mohiniraj Temple
The city of Nevasa is mainly famous for the Mohini Mohiniraj temple, the avatar(incarnation) of Lord Vishnu who beheaded Rahu and Ketu while distributing Amrut (sweet liquid which makes anyone immortal).

Every year a big festival of Shri Mohiniraj gets celebrated on the full moon day (Pournima) in the month of Magha of the Hindu calendar, which corresponds to January–February, in remembrance of Lord Vishnu's Mohini Avatar after Samudra manthan.
The elegantly designed Mohiniraj Temple in Ahmednagar is dedicated to Lord Vishnu. The new structure of this temple was constructed in 1773 at a cost of about Rs. 5 Lakhs by Gangadhar Yashwant Chandrachude. The 75 feet tall temple is decorated all over with ornamental work. The shrine houses an image of Mohiniraj, better known as Lord Vishnu. Also, in the Sabhamandap (Meeting Room), several images of other gods and goddesses such as Ganesh, Shiv – Parvati, Shani and Hanuman are displayed for their devotees.

According to a legend associated to this place, at the time when the sea was churned to get Amrut, Lord Vishnu appeared in the form of Mohini(a beautiful and enchanting damsel) to distract the demons and deprive them of Amrut. The demons stared at Mohini while Lord Vishnu distributed Amrut to the gods and water to demons.
Throughout the year three fairs are held in the town of Nevasa in honour of Mohiniraj. About fifty thousand people attend these fairs. 
Also part of this area is called Dandakaranya. The place where Lord Ram killed Marich is now a village called Toka, named after the arrow which Lord Rama used to kill Marich. Before Marich was killed by Lord Rama, he threw a Sura(Knife) towards Rama. This village is called Suregaon. After that he threw Bhala (spear), and hence that place is called Bhalgaon. Soon after that Marich shot an arrow, that place is called Banganga. At Banganga, the path of the river Godavari is shaped like a DhanushyaBan(Bow and arrow), so this place is called BANGANGA.

Other information 

The remains of a multilevel settlement dating from the Paleolithic period to the Middle Ages have been discovered at Navasa. Excavations were conducted by H. D. Sankalia in the 1950s and by G. Karve-Corvinus in 1967. Nevasa's Aeneolithic layer reveals a settled agricultural culture characterized in the second millennium B.C. by implements (elongated plates) similar to those of the Harappa civilization.

Newasa is also famous as sasurvadi (in laws) of the god Khandoba, The First wife Mhalsa of Khandoba is from Newasa bk name Mahalasa so khandoba is called Mhalasakant. Due to this pavitra sthal Sant Dnyaneshwar selected this place to write the world-famous grantha "Dnyaneshwari" "Bhawarthdipika" a commentary on Bhagavad Gita, popularly known as "Dnyaneshwari".

Saint Dnyaneshwar wrote a Dnyaneshwari in Nevasa beside a pole which is still there. Every year palkhi of Dnyaneshwari is taken to Pandharpur during ashadi ekadashi.

Mata Laxmi Temple is famous called Varkhedai in village Varkhed, Big Jatra is famous near about 7 to 10 lake people comes there Chaitra vaidya panchami for three days Chabina ceremony held there.

Moryachinchore is a famous village in Newasa Taluka. The Maurya dynasty ruled the village for about 2,000 years. A royal temple of the Maurya dynasty is Pohahicha Mahadev.

In Nevasa there is also a famous village called sukali also known as Gundwadi. In Gundwadi, there is a temple of Shakambhari devi. There is beautiful temple of lord shiva(Trivenishwar Mahadev Temple) in nearby village called Sureshnagar(Handinimgaon) .

Nearby places
A famous temple of Shani, Shani Shingnapur is located near Sonai in Nevasa Taluka.

Devgad : It has beautiful temple of Lord Dattatreya founded by Late Guruvarya Sri Kisangiri Maharaj, it attracts worshippers from all over the state. This place is well known among devotees for its beauty and cleanliness. The palkhi from Devgad to Pandharpur Ashadhi Eakadashi under the leadership of Bhaskargiri Maharaj is famous for its strict discipline and cleanliness.

Toka is The Border of The Great Maratha dynasty near Godavari River  where Pravara meets Godavari River is Toka

References

Cities and towns in Ahmednagar district
Ahmednagar district